Alan Rowe is the name of:

Alan Rowe (actor) English actor, born in New Zealand (1926–2000)
Alan Rowe (archaeologist) English archaeologist (1891–1968)
Alan Rowe, guitarist of the UK band Plutonik
Alan Rowe, (Australian actor)

See also
Alan Rowe Kelly, (born 1959) American actor and filmmaker